U.S. Route 25 (US 25) is a U.S. Highway that travels from Brunswick, Georgia to the Kentucky-Ohio state line, where Covington, Kentucky meets Cincinnati, Ohio at the Ohio River. In the U.S. state of Georgia, US 25 is as a  highway that travels south to north in the eastern part of the state, near the Atlantic Ocean, serving Brunswick, Statesboro, and Augusta on its path from Brunswick to South Carolina at the Savannah River. Its routing travels through portions of Glynn, Wayne, Long, Tattnall, Evans, Bulloch, Jenkins, Burke, and Richmond counties.

The segment of US 25 from Interstate 16 (I-16) south-southwest of Statesboro north to Millen is the western segment of the Savannah River Parkway, a four-lane divided highway that roughly parallels the Savannah River. The segment from Millen north to I-520 in Augusta is the combined segment of the parkway. This highway is being considered for inclusion as part of I-3, which is ultimately planned to stretch from Savannah to Knoxville, Tennessee.

Route description

Glynn County
US 25 begins at an intersection with US 17/SR 25 (Glynn Avenue) in the southern part of Brunswick in Glynn County. This intersection also marks the southern terminus of SR 25 Connector. This intersection is west of the Marshes of Glynn Overlook Park and is north of Howard Coffin Park. US 25 and SR 25 Connector travel concurrently on Gloucester Street to the west-southwest. At the intersection with US 341/SR 27 (Oglethorpe Street), SR 25 Connector ends, and US 25 begins a nearly  concurrency with US 341/SR 27. The three highways travel to the north-northwest. Just after F Street, they curve to the north-northeast and skirt along the western edge of Gateway Park. On the northern edge of the park, they intersect Newcastle Street and turn left, back to the north-northwest. Between L and M Streets, the concurrency passes just to the southwest of Orange Park, and between Q and R Streets, they pass to the southwest of Palmetto Park. Between the intersection with Oak Street/1st Street, US 25/US 341/SR 27 pass Greenwood Cemetery. Between 2nd and 5th Streets, they pass Selden Park. Between 4th and 7th Streets, they pass Palmetto Cemetery. At 7th Street, they enter Dock Junction. Just before 9th Street, the concurrency passes Acco Park. Farther to the north-northwest, they intersect SR 303 (Blythe Island Highway/Community Road). The roadway passes to the southwest of Ballard Park and cross over the Brunswick–Altamaha Canal. Immediately, US 25/US 341/SR 27 begin to curve to the northwest. Approximately  later, they cross over Yellow Bluff Creek. Only about  later, they have an interchange with Interstate 95 (I-95; Purple Heart Trail). At Crispen Boulevard, the concurrency leaves the city limits of Dock Junction. They cross over Burnett Creek and travel through Pyles Marsh, before curving back to the north-northwest. Immediately after that curve, the three highways travel through Brobston. Just before entering Sterling, they pass east of Sterling Park. In town, they intersect SR 99, as well as the eastern terminus of SR 32. The highways travel through Pennick and Zuta, before passing to the southeast of Berry Lake. After traveling through Everett, they enter Wayne County.

Wayne County
When the concurrent routes pass Mt. Pleasant Cemetery, they curve back to the northwest, travel through Mt. Pleasant and cross over Alex Creek. After traveling through Grangerville, Pendarvis, and Gardi, they make a slight westward jog in Odessa; then, they cross over Ponholloway Creek, before entering Jesup. In town, US 25 splits off from US 341/SR 27 (East Cherry Street) to the north-northwest and intersects US 301/SR 23, with which US 25 begins traveling concurrently. The three highways travel to the north-northeast in the northeast part of the city. They curve to the north-northwest, before curving to the north and meeting US 84/SR 38, which join the concurrency. Immediately afterward, the five highways travel to the north-northeast and leave the city limits. The concurrency travels through rural parts of the county, before traveling through Doctortown, and curving to the northeast and crossing over the Altamaha River into Long County on the Dr. J. Alvin Leaphart Sr. Memorial Bridge.

Long County
US 25/US 84/US 301/SR 23/SR 38 continue to the northeast and travel through rural areas of the county, crossing over Forrest Pond, Back Swamp (in two places), Corker Branch, Fountain Branch, Brickyard Branch, and Jones Creek on its way to Ludowici. In town, the concurrency intersects SR 57 south, which travels to the southeast. At this intersection, US 25/US 301/SR 23, as well as SR 57 north travel to the northwest, while US 84/SR 38 continue to the northeast. After a slight jog to the east, the roadway crosses through Wefanie. Just before leaving the county, they intersect the southwest terminus of former SR 261, today known as Marcus Nobles Road. Right after that, they curve to the north-northwest and cross over Beards Creek into Tattnall County.

Tattnall County
US 25/US 301/SR 23/SR 57 travel to the east of Kicklighters Pond. After an intersection with the western terminus of SR 196, the roadway curves to the north-northeast and enters Glennville. At an intersection with SR 144 (Barnard Street), SR 23/SR 57 depart the concurrency to the northwest. At this intersection, US 25/US 301 continue to the north-northeast, concurrent with SR 73, which begins here. Just after leaving the city limits, the highways pass the Georgia Veterans Memorial Cemetery – Glennville, Stricklands Pond, and Strickland Pond Dam. Alongside Smith State Prison, the concurrency begins to curve to the north. They curve back to the north-northeast and cross over Beards Creek just before intersecting the southern terminus of what used to be SR 250. After passing to the east of Durrence Pond, just west of Midway, US 25/US 301/SR 73 cross into Evans County.

Evans County
The concurrency passes to the east of Union Cemetery and then to the west of Evans Heights Golf Club. Approximately  later, it crosses over Bull Creek. After a westward jog past Richards Pond, the highways curve to a due north routing and enter Claxton. In downtown, they intersect US 280/SR 30 (Main Street). Just before leaving town, the highways curve to the northeast. Just northeast of the city limits, US 25/US 301/SR 73 pass southeast of the Claxton Sewage Treatment Pond and the Claxton Sewage Treatment Pond Dam. About  later, they cross over the Canoochee River on the Claxton Bridge. They provide access to the Claxton–Evans County Airport and then curve to the north-northwest. After curving back to the north-northeast, the highways curve to a due north routing and intersect the northern terminus of SR 169. About  later, they cross into Bulloch County.

Bulloch County
Almost immediately, the three highways curve to the north-northwest, passing Ephesus Cemetery, and curve back to the north-northeast and pass by Nevils Pond and Nevils Pond Dam. They again curve to the north-northwest and have an interchange with I-16 (Jim Gillis Historic Savannah Parkway). US 25/US 301/SR 73 curve to a nearly due north routing briefly before curving to the northeast and intersect SR 46, southeast of Register, just before crossing over Lotts Creek. The highways pass Riggs Lake and Riggs Lake Dam. Later on, they travel through Jimps, just before passing a campus of Ogeechee Technical College. They intersect the southern terminus of US 25 Byp./SR 67 Byp. and US 301 Byp./SR 73 Byp. (Veterans Memorial Parkway) and enter Statesboro. They pass just to the west of Georgia Southern University and skirt along the eastern edge of W. Jones Lane Memorial Park. They curve to the north-northeast and cross over Little Lotts Creek before intersecting SR 67 (Fair Road). In downtown, they curve to the north-northwest and intersect US 80/SR 26 (Northside Drive East). At this intersection, US 301/SR 73 continue to the north-northwest, while US 25/SR 67 travel to the west-southwest, concurrent with US 80/SR 26. The four highway curve to the north-northwest before assuming a more northwesterly routing. After leaving the city limits, they intersect the northern terminus of US 25 Byp./SR 67 Byp. They provide access to William James Middle School. In Hopeulikit, the four highways curve to the north-northwest; then, US 80/SR 26 split off to the southwest. About  later, US 25/SR 67 enter Jenkins County.

Jenkins County
After continuing to the north-northwest, US 25/SR 67 pass just to the northeast of Paynes Chapel Cemetery and Clifton Cemetery, before they curve to the north-northeast. Then, they intersect SR 121, which joins the concurrency. Approximately  later, immediately after traveling through Emmalane, they intersect SR 23, which also joins the concurrency. At Union Camp Logging Road, the four highways curve to the northeast and cross over the Ogeechee River. Just after entering Millen, they begin to curve to the north-northeast and intersect SR 17 Byp. (South Gray Street), which joins the concurrency. At an intersection with SR 17 (Winthrope Avenue), SR 17 Byp. ends, and SR 23/SR 67 depart the concurrency to the east. Less than  before leaving town, US 25/SR 121 curve to the north-northwest. On the northern edge of the city limits, they intersect the northern terminus of SR 21. The two highways pass the Magnolia Springs Country Club and travel through the southwestern part of Magnolia Springs State Park, in the community of Lawton. On the northwestern edge of the park, they pass Millen Airport and curve back to the north-northeast, passing Magnolia View Lake and travel to the west of Perkins; then they curve once again to the north-northwest and enter Burke County.

Burke County
The concurrency travels just to the west of Munnerlyn, passing Jenkins Lake, and make a slight westward jog, and curve to a due north routing before curving back to the north-northwest in Idlewood and passing Burke County Airport. They intersect the southern terminus of US 25 Byp./SR 121 Byp. (Burke Veterans Parkway). The mainline highways turn to the right and curve back to the north-northwest and have an interchange with the bypass route. Just before entering Waynesboro the roadway passes to the west of the Burke County campus of Augusta Technical College. In town, they curve to the north-northeast and intersect SR 24, which joins the concurrency. The three highways travel to the northwest and pass Burke Medical Center and the Burke County Museum. They intersect SR 56/SR 80 (6th Street). At this intersection, SR 24 departs the concurrency to the southwest. Just past 9th Street, they pass Burkeland Garden. About  past the West 13th Street/Peachtree Street intersection, the concurrency begins to curve to the north-northeast to an intersection with the northern terminus of US 25 Byp./SR 121 Byp. The mainline highways turn left and begin curving to the north-northwest and leave town; then, they curve to a nearly due north routing. They cross over Walnut Branch and Brier Creek, before traveling to the west of Stockton Pond. Approximately  later, the highways cross over McBean Creek into Richmond County and the city limits of Augusta.

Richmond County

Just before passing the Pointe South Golf Club, US 25/SR 121 begin to travel along the Hephzibah–Augusta city line. They intersect the eastern terminus of SR 88. After curving to the north-northeast, they re-enter Augusta proper. They pass the Richmond Factory Pond and Richmond Factory Pond Dam and curve to the northeast. Then they pass by the East Central Regional Hospital–Gracewood. The two highways curve to the north and cross over Butler Creek and make a gradual winding path to an interchange with I-520 (Bobby Jones Expressway), passing to the west of Foss Park and the Charles B. Webster Detention Center and to the east of Rollins Elementary School and Sego Middle School along the way. US 25/SR 121 intersect Windsor Spring Road, which is also part of the I-520 interchange. The roadway curves to the north-northeast. At the intersection with Lumpkin Road, they pass Alleluia Community School and are just to the west of Elliot Park. The concurrency crosses over Rocky Creek just southeast of Lombard Pond. It curves to the northeast and intersects the southern terminus of Tubman Home Road and the northern terminus of SR 56 (Mike Padgett Highway). Approximately  later, they have an interchange with US 1/US 78/US 278/SR 10 (Gordon Highway) and begin to travel concurrently with those four highways. The six-highway concurrency continue to the northeast, to an intersection with the southern terminus of Molly Pond Road and the northern terminus of Doug Barnard Parkway (former SR 56 Spur). Just before that intersection, the roadway begins to curve to the north-northeast. The highways pass just to the northwest of Magnolia Cemetery, Cedar Grove Cemetery, and May Park and southeast of James Brown Arena. A short distance later, they pass to the east of Old Medical College and the Old Government House, then an interchange with US 25 Bus./SR 28 (Broad Street). Here, US 25 Bus. meets its southern terminus. Just after this interchange, the highway crosses over the Savannah River into South Carolina. At the state line, SR 10 ends, while US 1/US 25/US 78/US 278/SR 121 (Continues as SC 121) curves to the northeast toward North Augusta.

National Highway System
From its southern terminus, in Brunswick, to Ludowici and from I-16, south-southwest of Statesboro to its northern terminus, at the South Carolina state line on the northeastern edge of Augusta are included as part of the National Highway System, a system of routes determined to be the most important for the nation's economy, mobility, and defense.

History

1920s
The road that would later be designated as part of US 25 was established in 1920 as an unidentified road from Brunswick to about Sterling, SR 27 from that point to Jesup, SR 38 from Jesup to Ludowici, SR 23 from Statesboro to Millen, and SR 21 from Millen to Augusta. By the end of the next year, SR 23 was designated between Ludowici and Glennville, SR 26 was designated on a routing southwest of, and into, Statesboro, SR 46 was designated between Statesboro and Hopeulikit, and SR 67 was designated from Hopeulikit to a point southwest of Millen. The latter two supplanting SR 23, which was re-routed on a more westerly path. By the end of 1926, US 341 was designated along SR 27 between Brunswick and Jesup. By the end of 1929, US 80 had been designated along SR 46 between Statesboro and Hopeulikit.

1930s
By 1932, US 341/SR 27 were paved in Glynn County. Also, SR 73 was designated from Clayton to an intersection with SR 26 southwest of Statesboro, approximately where I-16 is today. Farther to the north-northwest, US 25 was designated from Hopeulikit to Augusta, and US 25/SR 21 were paved from Waynesboro to Augusta. That January, the positions of SR 26 and SR 46 were swapped. In April, SR 23's Ludowici–Darien segment was redesignated as part of SR 99; SR 23 was re-routed along SR 38 between Jesup and Ludowici. By May 1933, that Jesup–Ludowici segment of SR 23/SR 38 was paved. In May, US 25/SR 21 were paved from Millen to just north of the Jenkins–Burke county line. In July, SR 23 was paved from the Long–Tattnall county line to Glennville. In late 1934, SR 73 was extended southward from Claxton to Glennville. A vert short stretch of SR 46 south of Statesboro was paved. US 25/SR 67 was paved from just southeast of the SR 23 intersection south-southwest of Millen and into that town. Between June and October 1935, US 25/SR 21 was paved between the Jenkins–Burke county line and Waynesboro. At the end of that year, nearly half of US 341/SR 27, between the Glynn–Wayne county line and Jesup, was paved. In mid-to-late 1936, SR 46 was paved from the SR 73 intersection southwest of Statesboro into the city. About one year later, all of US 341/SR 27 between Brunswick and Jesup were paved. Also, a short stretch of SR 23 northwest of Ludowici was paved. In August 1938, all of SR 23 between Ludowici and Glennville was paved. By mid-1939, US 25 was designated along US 341/SR 27 between Sterling (and perhaps Brunswick) and Jesup. It was also designated along SR 23 between Ludowici and Glennville and along SR 73 between Claxton and the intersection with SR 46, southwest of Statesboro. It is unclear whether it was designated along the stretches of roadway in between those.

1940s
Between April and July 1941, US 25/SR 73, between the Evans–Bulloch county line and the intersection with SR 46, were paved. In 1942, SR 73 was paved from Glennville to the Tattnall–Evans county line. In 1943, SR 73 was paved all the way from Glennville to Claxton. By the end of 1946, US 25 was designated along SR 23/SR 38 between Jesup and Ludowici. In Augusta, US 25 (and presumably SR 21) approached downtown on Savannah Road. It intersected US 1/US 78 (Milledgeville Road). The three highways traveled to the northeast on Twiggs Street until just past Gwinnett Street, where they curved to the north-northeast onto 7th Street. At the intersection with SR 28 (Broad Street), US 1/US 78 turned right, while US 25 turned left. At 13th Street, US 25 turned to the right and crossed into South Carolina. Also, all stretches of road from Brunswick to Augusta were paved. By the middle of 1948, US 301 was designated along US 25/SR 23 from Ludowici to Glennville.

1950s
By the end of 1953, US 301 was designated along SR 73 between Glennville and Claxton. In 1955, US 278 was added to the intersection of US 1/US 78 and US 25 in Augusta. Also, US 1/US 78 left the concurrency with US 25 just past Gwinnett Street and turned right onto Calhoun Street, then left onto 8th Street. In 1956, the four U.S. highways in Augusta were re-routed on a bypass to the east of the main part of downtown. The former route of US 78 became part of SR 12, and the former route of US 1 became part of SR 4. SR 4 also took the former route of US 25 through the city, but ended at SR 28. US 25 followed the bypass onto 8th Street with US 1/US 78/US 278. At the intersection with SR 28, it turned left as it had done previously, just a little farther to the east-southeast. It appears that US 278 ended at this intersection. SR 21 followed Savannah Road and ended at the intersection with SR 4.

1960s
By the middle of 1960, US 25 was no longer routed on Broad and 13th Streets. It was re-routed to continue following US 1/US 78 and SR 10, which had only recently joined the concurrency. In its place was the newly commissioned US 25 Business. Between 1960 and 1963, SR 121 was designated, concurrent with US 25, as it does today. At least as far back as 1965, US 25/US 341/SR 27 traveled through Brunswick on Norwich Street, before being moved slightly to the west. During this time period, the eastern bypass in Augusta was named Gordon Highway. SR 121's concurrent section was designated along US 25, as it exists today. The Gordon Highway–Broad Street intersection was reconfigured into an interchange.

1980s
In the early part of the decade, SR 21's concurrency with US 25 was truncated at Millen. Between 1983 and 1986, US 25/US 341/SR 27 were moved to the west in Brunswick to follow Newcastle Street.

Future 

The segment of US 25 from Interstate 16 (I-16) south-southwest of Statesboro north to Millen is the western segment of the Savannah River Parkway, a four-lane divided highway that roughly parallels the Savannah River. The segment from Millen north to I-520 in Augusta is the combined segment of the parkway. This highway is being considered for inclusion as part of I-3, which is ultimately planned to stretch from Savannah to Knoxville, Tennessee.

Major intersections

See also
 
 
 Special routes of U.S. Route 25

References

External links

 Georgia @ SouthEastRoads - U.S. Highway 25
 End of US highway 25
 25 Georgia's US Highways
 US 25 Traffic Conditions Georgia

 Georgia
25
Transportation in Glynn County, Georgia
Transportation in Wayne County, Georgia
Transportation in Long County, Georgia
Transportation in Tattnall County, Georgia
Transportation in Evans County, Georgia
Transportation in Bulloch County, Georgia
Transportation in Jenkins County, Georgia
Transportation in Burke County, Georgia
Transportation in Richmond County, Georgia
Brunswick, Georgia
Transportation in Augusta, Georgia